Tomáš Hübschman (born 4 September 1981) is a Czech professional footballer who plays for FK Jablonec. He can play as a centre-back or defensive midfielder and is known for his strength, speed and tight marking.

Club career

Sparta Prague
Before joining Shakhtar Donetsk in the summer of 2004, Hübschman played for Sparta Prague, having started playing for the club's youth at age five and signing his first professional contract in 1998. Hübschman first came to prominence after joining Jablonec on a loan for the 2001–02 season. After gaining positive reviews, he returned to Sparta, where he was a regular in their 2002–03 UEFA Champions League run, playing 11 matches. In the 2003–04 season, he helped the club to the knockout stage of the 2003–04 Champions League and ended the season helping Sparta win the Czech Cup after beating fierce rivals Baník Ostrava 2–1.

Shakhtar Donetsk
After several successful seasons in his homeland, Hübschman joined Shakhtar Donetsk for a reported fee of €3 million transfer fee. Hübschman made an immediate impact, becoming a regular in the team and has won two league titles in his first two seasons and became a champion of the UEFA Cup in 2009.

During an April 2012 Ukrainian derby, Hübschman put in a superb, man of the match performance in midfield to help his side defeat title rivals Dynamo Kyiv 2–0, a result which drew Shakhtar level on points in the league. The previous month, Hübschmann scored his first Ukrainian Premier League goal in two seasons to help the Miners defeat Illichivets Mariupol 2–1.

Baumit Jablonec
In July 2014, Hübschman returned to Baumit Jablonec 13 years after his loan spell with the club, signing a three-year contract.

International career
Hübschman has represented the Czech Republic at various youth levels and captained his country's under-20 team at the 2001 FIFA U-20 World Cup. He was also part of the Czech side which won the UEFA U-21 Championships in 2002. He then played for the senior team at UEFA Euro 2004, albeit only a minor role, as well as several matches in 2006 FIFA World Cup qualification, although not part of main squad when the Czechs did qualify for the final tournament.

Career statistics

Club

Honours
Sparta Prague
Czech First League: 1999–2000, 2002–03
Czech Cup: 2003–04

Shakhtar Donetsk
Vyshcha Liha/Ukrainian Premier League: 2004–05, 2005–06, 2007–08, 2009–10, 2010–11, 2011–12, 2012–13, 2013–14
Ukrainian Cup: 2007–08, 2010–11, 2011–12, 2012–13
Ukrainian Super Cup: 2005, 2008, 2010, 2012, 2013
UEFA Cup: 2008–09

References

External links

 
 
 
 
 

Living people
1981 births
Footballers from Prague
Association football defenders
Czech footballers
Czech expatriate footballers
Czech people of German descent
Expatriate footballers in Ukraine
Czech Republic youth international footballers
Czech Republic under-21 international footballers
Czech Republic international footballers
AC Sparta Prague players
FC Shakhtar Donetsk players
UEFA Cup winning players
FC Fastav Zlín players
FK Jablonec players
UEFA Euro 2004 players
UEFA Euro 2012 players
Czech First League players
Ukrainian Premier League players
Czech expatriate sportspeople in Ukraine